Floriańska Street or St. Florian's Street is one of the main streets in Kraków Old Town and one of the most famous promenades in the city. The street forms part of the regular grid plan of Stare Miasto (the Old Town), the merchants' town that extends the medieval heart of the city, which was drawn up in 1257 after the destruction of the city during the first Mongol invasion of Poland of 1241.

Location

Floriańska appears on the 1257 plan of the extended city. There are currently 51 numbered buildings on the street (up to no 44 even and no 57 odd). It is named after Saint Florian.

In 1882, the first horse tram line started. In 1901 it was transformed into the electricity line (now defunct).

A number of notable landmarks and monuments, mainly kamienica-style buildings, are located on the street. They include buildings in the first half no 1, Kamienica pod Murzynami, no 2, Kamienica Mennica, no 13, Kamienica "Amendzińska" (also known as the Kmita Palace), no 14, the Hotel Pod Rózą, and later, the Pharmacy Museum of the Jagiellonian University Medical College at no 25, the Jan Matejko House at no 41, and the Jama Michalika cafe at no 45. The north-western end of the street passes through St. Florian's Gate.

Today, the street is a major tourist attraction, and most buildings feature shops, restaurants, cafes and similar establishments. In 2007, the Polish magazine Wprost ranked Floriańska Street as the third most prestigious street in Poland, and the most prestigious in Kraków, following  Warsaw's Nowy Świat (New World Street) and Krakowskie Przedmieście Street. In 2011 and 2013, rents at Floriańska Street was the second highest in Poland, second only to that for Nowy Świat Street.

References

Further reading

External links

 Kraków ul. Floriańska i okolice, ekspozycje.org.pl

Streets in Kraków
Tourist attractions in Kraków
13th-century establishments in Poland